Vorontsovo is a rural locality (a village) in Razdolyevskoye Rural Settlement, Kolchuginsky District, Vladimir Oblast, Russia. The population was 2 as of 2010. There are 4 streets.

Geography 
Vorontsovo is located 12 km southwest of Kolchugino (the district's administrative centre) by road. Korobovshchinsky is the nearest rural locality.

References 

Rural localities in Kolchuginsky District